Moskalenki is the name of several urban and rural inhabited localities (urban-type work settlements and villages) in Russia.

Urban localities
Moskalenki, Omsk Oblast, a work settlement in Moskalensky District of Omsk Oblast

Rural localities
Moskalenki, Smolensk Oblast, a village in Smoligovskoye Rural Settlement of Rudnyansky District of Smolensk Oblast